Nugget Nell is a 1919 American comedy silent film directed by Elmer Clifton and written by John R. Cornish. The film stars Dorothy Gish, David Butler, Raymond Cannon, Regina Sarle, Jim Farley, and Bob Fleming. The film was released on July 27, 1919, by Paramount Pictures. It is not known whether the film currently survives.

Plot
As described in a film magazine, Nugget Nell (Gish) is the proprietress of a stage depot in the early west. to her hostelry comes the wealthy and well groomed City Chap (Cannon), who ignores her love prompted advances. She robs the ladies of the area of their fine clothes and adorns herself for his delectation, but with no results. When he leaves, she learns that the Wolf Gang is planning to hold up the stage and rob him. She in turn robs the gang and frees the City Chap. They are run to cover in a deserted hut where she successfully fights off their pursuers. However, she has learned that City Chap is a coward, so she sends him on his way and goes back to Big Hearted Jim (Butler), her faithful admirer.

Cast
Dorothy Gish as Nugget Nell
David Butler as Big Hearted Jim
Raymond Cannon as The City Chap
Regina Sarle as The Child
Jim Farley as Badman #1 
Bob Fleming as Badman #2
Wilbur Higby as Nell's uncle
Emily Chichester as The Ingenue

References

External links 
 
 

1919 films
1910s English-language films
Silent American comedy films
1919 comedy films
Paramount Pictures films
Films directed by Elmer Clifton
American black-and-white films
American silent feature films
1910s American films